Minister of Foreign Affairs of the Democratic Republic of the Congo (known as the Republic of the Congo in 1960–71 and the Republic of Zaire in 1971–97) is a government minister in charge of the Ministry of Foreign Affairs of the Democratic Republic of the Congo, responsible for conducting foreign relations of the country.

The following is a list of foreign ministers of the Democratic Republic of the Congo since its founding in 1960:

Notes

References

DRC, Foreign ministers
 
Foreign ministers